The 1964 Los Angeles Rams season was the team's 27th year competing as a member of the National Football League (NFL) and the 19th season in Los Angeles. The Rams were attempting to improve on their 5-9 record from the previous season and make the playoffs for the first time since 1955. The season got off to a promising start with wins over Pittsburgh and Minnesota, sandwiched around a tie against the Detroit Lions. However the Rams lost their next two games on the road to the Bears and Colts to even their record at 2-2-1. The Rams rebounded by winning 3 of their next 4 games to stand at 5-3-1, and their playoff hopes intact. However, the Rams collapsed in their final 5 games, going 0-4-1, with the tie coming against the Green Bay Packers in the final game of the season. The Rams ultimately finished with a 5-7-2 record and missed the postseason for the 9th straight year.

Schedule

Standings

References

Los Angeles Rams
Los Angeles Rams seasons
Los Angeles Rams